Ribet may refer to:

 Florent Ribet (born 1989), French bobsledder who competed at the 2014 Winter Olympics
 Ken Ribet (born 1948), American mathematician
 Ribet Academy, a private independent boarding school for boys and girls in Los Angeles, California

See also
 Beijing Shuren Ribet Private School, Beijing, China
 Herbrand–Ribet theorem, in mathematics
 Ribet's lemma, named after Ken Ribet
 Ribet's theorem, proved by Ken Ribet
 Stade Jules Ribet, a rugby stadium in Saint-Gaudens, France